Bhavnagar Port is a seaport in Saurashtra region of Gujarat state in Western India. Bhavnagar has had trade links with Southeast Asia, Africa, Arabia and ports of Red Sea since the early 18th century.

The original port Bhavnagar Harbor located at  built by the state of Bhavnagar was a very important part of the commerce. It also hosted a light beacon since 1860. This port was later modernized in 1930 under the supervision of J. Johnston, then Port Officer of Bhavnagar state. Wharfs, warehouses, and railway transportation were added. A new port, 8 km south of the original port was built and made operational in 1950s due to heavy silting at the location of the old port. This port also had a lighthouse, which was damaged in the 2001 earthquake.

Bruce White's company was responsible for the design of the Bhavnagar Port along with Chiswick flyover and Bombay Marine Oil Terminal. Bhavnagar lockgate, built in 1963 and the first of its kind in India when built, is one of the oldest bundar in Gujarat and is very useful to keep ships afloat during low tide.

References

Further reading 

 Mulberry – The Return in Triumph by Michael Harrison, 1965
 A Harbour Goes To War: The Story of Mulberry and the Men Who Made It Happen - J. Evans, R. Walter, E. Palmer; publisher - South Machars Historical Society, 2000

External links
 Bhavnagar Port
 Ports.com

Bhavnagar
Saurashtra (region)
Economy of Gujarat
Transport in Gujarat
Ports and harbours of the Arabian Sea
Ports and harbours of Gujarat